Chaplain (Major General) Donald L. Rutherford, USA (born August 4, 1955) is an American Army officer and a Roman Catholic priest of the Archdiocese for the Military Services who served as the 23rd Chief of Chaplains of the United States Army.

On February 18, 2011, Secretary of Defense Robert Gates announced that Rutherford was nominated for promotion to major general and assignment of Chief of Chaplains of the United States Army. He assumed this role on July 22, 2011. He was succeeded by Paul K. Hurley on May 22, 2015.

Awards and decorations

See also
Armed Forces Chaplains Board
Chiefs of Chaplains of the United States

References

External links

 U.S. Army biography

1955 births
Living people
United States Army generals
Recipients of the Legion of Merit
People from Kinderhook, New York
Military personnel from New York (state)
Religious leaders from New York (state)
Chiefs of Chaplains of the United States Army
Deputy Chiefs of Chaplains of the United States Army
20th-century American Roman Catholic priests
21st-century American Roman Catholic priests